Henriksenia is a genus of crab spiders that was first described by Pekka T. Lehtinen in 2004.  it contains two species, found in Asia and Papua New Guinea: H. hilaris and H. thienemanni.

See also
 List of Thomisidae species

References

Further reading

Araneomorphae genera
Spiders of Asia
Taxa named by Pekka T. Lehtinen
Thomisidae